Lufubu is a constituency of the National Assembly of Zambia. It covers a large rural area in the Ngabwe District of Central Province. It was created in 2016.

List of MPs

References

Constituencies of the National Assembly of Zambia
2016 establishments in Zambia
Constituencies established in 2016